Yuma County is a county located in the U.S. state of Colorado. As of the 2020 census, the population was 9,988. The county seat is Wray.

Geography

The point where the Arikaree River flows out of Yuma County and into Cheyenne County, Kansas is the lowest point in the State of Colorado at 1,010 meters (3,315 feet) elevation.  This crossing point is the highest low point of any U.S. state.

Adjacent counties
Phillips County (north)
Chase County, Nebraska (northeast)
Cheyenne County, Kansas (east/Central Time border)
Dundy County, Nebraska (east)
Kit Carson County (south)
Washington County (west)
Logan County (northwest)

Major Highways
  U.S. Highway 34
  U.S. Highway 36
  U.S. Highway 385
  State Highway 59

Demographics

At the 2000 census there were 9,841 people, 3,800 households, and 2,644 families living in the county.  The population density was 4 people per square mile (2/km2).  There were 4,295 housing units at an average density of 2 per square mile (1/km2).  The racial makeup of the county was 94.17% White, 0.11% Black or African American, 0.28% Native American, 0.07% Asian, 0.02% Pacific Islander, 4.14% from other races, and 1.21% from two or more races.  12.88% of the population were Hispanic or Latino of any race.
Of the 3,800 households 33.30% had children under the age of 18 living with them, 59.60% were married couples living together, 6.80% had a female householder with no husband present, and 30.40% were non-families. 27.40% of households were one person and 13.30% were one person aged 65 or older.  The average household size was 2.55 and the average family size was 3.13.

The age distribution was 28.30% under the age of 18, 7.10% from 18 to 24, 26.00% from 25 to 44, 22.30% from 45 to 64, and 16.30% 65 or older.  The median age was 37 years. For every 100 females there were 96.80 males.  For every 100 females age 18 and over, there were 94.90 males.

The median household income was $33,169 and the median family income  was $39,814. Males had a median income of $26,124 versus $18,578 for females. The per capita income for the county was $16,005.  About 8.80% of families and 12.90% of the population were below the poverty line, including 15.50% of those under age 18 and 10.70% of those age 65 or over.

Politics
Yuma County is a Republican Party stronghold in presidential elections. Only nine presidential elections from 1892 to the present day have seen the county fail to back the Republican candidate, the most recent being 1964 during Lyndon B. Johnson's statewide & national landslide.

Communities

Cities
Wray
Yuma

Town
Eckley

Census-designated places
Idalia
Joes
Kirk
Laird
Vernon

Other unincorporated community
Hale

Ghost towns

Abarr
Alvin
Arlene
Armel
Arnold
Avoca 
Beecher
Bolton 
Bryant
Clarkville
Condon
Ford
Fox
Friend
Gurney
Happyville
Heartstrong
Hermes
Hughes
Ladlum
Lansing
Leslie
Logan
Mildred
Newton
Robb
Rogers
Schramm
Shields
Steffens
Wages
Wauneta
Waverly
Weld City
Witherbee

See also

Outline of Colorado
Index of Colorado-related articles
National Register of Historic Places listings in Yuma County, Colorado

References

External links
Yuma County Government website
Yuma County farm photos and documentation, from Historic American Buildings Survey
Colorado County Evolution by Don Stanwyck
Colorado Historical Society

 

 
Colorado counties
1889 establishments in Colorado
Eastern Plains
Populated places established in 1889